No Future No Hope is the first LP from the American anarcho street punk band Defiance, released in the U.S. by Mind Control and in Europe by Skuld Releases.

Track listing 
Fuck Them All - 3:37
Fodder - 2:33
No Future No Hope - 4:46
How Much Longer - 3:28
You Got It All Wrong - 4:15
Anti Social - 4:55
Fuck This City - 4:04
Hands of the Few - 2:18
I Hate Everything - 4:57
Self Imposed Slavery - 3:25
Burn - 3:48
Rip Off - 2:47
Police Oppression - 2:21 (Angelic Upstarts cover)

Defiance (punk band) albums
1996 albums